2016 Men's Volleyball Thai-Denmark Super League was the 3rd edition of the tournament. It was held at the MCC Hall of The Mall Bangkapi in Bangkok, Thailand from 23 – 28 March 2016.

Teams
 Chonburi E-Tech Air Force
 Kasesart
 Nakhon Ratchasima
 Ratchaburi
 Sisaket Krungkao
 Wing 46 Phitsanulok

Pools composition

Preliminary round

Pool A

|}

|}

Pool B

|}

|}

Final round

Semifinals

|}

Final

|}

Final standing

Awards

See also 
 2016 Women's Volleyball Thai-Denmark Super League

References
 

Volleyball,Thai-Denmark Super League
Thai-Denmark Super League
Men's,2016